Lee Hill (July 8, 1894 – September 15, 1957) was an American actor of the silent era. He appeared in 74 films between 1914 and 1924. He was born in Minnesota and died in Los Angeles, California.

Selected filmography
 Shanghaied (1915)
 Guilty (1916)
 Behind the Lines (1916)
 The Fuel of Life (1917)
 Station Content (1918)
 False Ambition (1918)
 A Sporting Chance (1919)
 Girls (1919)
 A Master Stroke (1920)
 Cytherea (1924)

External links

1894 births
1957 deaths
American male film actors
American male silent film actors
20th-century American male actors
Male actors from Minnesota